Eupatorium lancifolium, commonly called lanceleaf thoroughwort, is a North American herbaceous perennial plant in the family Asteraceae native to the south-central United States (Mississippi, Alabama, Arkansas, Louisiana and Texas).

It is related to Eupatorium semiserratum and has sometimes been considered to be part of that species, but can be distinguished by the size and color of the leaves and because it grows in wetter areas.

References

lancifolium
Flora of the Southern United States
Plants described in 1841